Edgardo Antonio Serpas (born 25 January 1974) is a Salvadoran sprinter. He competed in the men's 100 metres at the 2000 Summer Olympics, finishing sixth in his first-round heat.

References

1974 births
Living people
Athletes (track and field) at the 2000 Summer Olympics
Salvadoran male sprinters
Olympic athletes of El Salvador
Athletes (track and field) at the 1999 Pan American Games
Pan American Games competitors for El Salvador
Place of birth missing (living people)
Central American Games gold medalists for El Salvador
Central American Games medalists in athletics